The Ngozumpa glacier, below the sixth highest mountain in the world Cho Oyu in Nepal, at , is the longest glacier in the Himalayas. Ngozumpa Glacier is a large persistent body of ice. It flows slowly due to stresses induced by its weight.

Ngozumpa Spillway lake 

The Nepali Himalayas have been warming significantly over recent decades. Ngozumpa glacier is showing signs of shrinking and thinning, producing melt water. Some of this water pools on the surface where an enormous lake is growing. In the future this might be a threat to the Sherpa villages down the valley.

See also 
 Gokyo Lakes

References

Glaciers of Nepal
Glaciers of the Himalayas